Charles Carey Matthews (September 18, 1921 – September 13, 1992) was an American politician. He served as a Democratic member for the 110th district of the Florida House of Representatives.

Matthews was born in New York on September 18, 1921. Matthews attended Yale University and Amherst College. He moved to Florida in 1952. In 1968, Matthews was elected for the 110th district of the Florida House of Representatives. He succeeded George Firestone. In January 1972, Matthews resigned and was succeeded by Walter Wallace Sackett Jr.

Matthews was a long time resident of Live Oak, Florida. He died in Pompano Beach on September 13, 1992, at the age of 70.

References 

1921 births
1992 deaths
People from New York (state)
Democratic Party members of the Florida House of Representatives
20th-century American politicians
Yale University alumni
Amherst College alumni